Jabal Tiyal, also known as "Jabal Adiyah", is a Sarawat mountain located near Sana'a, the capital city of Yemen. At , it is Yemen's second highest peak, after Jabal An-Nabi Shu'ayb, as well as the second highest of the Arabian Peninsula.

It is located midway between Sana'a and Sirwah to the east.

See also
 South Arabia

References

External links
 خولان بني جبر الطيال ،،يالشامخات السود (YouTube, in Arabic])
 جبل الطيال بني جبر خولان الطيال
 مقطع بالكيلو 3 في طريق جبل اللوز العارضة وادي بني سحام - خولان الطيال

Tiyal